Statistics of League of Ireland in the 1952/1953 season.

Overview
It was contested by 12 teams, and Shelbourne won the championship.

Final classification

Results

Top scorers

Ireland
League of Ireland seasons
1952–53 in Republic of Ireland association football